Sphyrocosta is a monotypic genus of moth in the family of Geometridae.

There is only one species in this genus: Sphyrocosta madecassa Viette, 1973 from Madagascar.

References

Krüger, M. 2001a. A revision of the tribe Macariini (Lepidoptera: Geometridae: Ennominae) of Africa, Madagascar and Arabia. - Bulletin of the Natural History Museum 70(1):1–502

Ennominae
Moths of Madagascar
Moths of Africa
Geometridae genera
Monotypic moth genera